FHP may refer to:

Health and medicine 
 Feminine hygiene product
 Foot health practitioner
 Forward head posture

Other uses 
 Fachhochschule Potsdam, a vocational college in Germany
 Florida Highway Patrol
 Fractional horsepower
 François-Henri Pinault (born 1962), French businessman
 Heppenheim (Bergstr) station, in Germany
 Binhai West railway station, China Railway telegraph code FHP